Bence Deutsch (born 4 August 1992) is a Hungarian professional footballer who plays for BFC Siófok. His father is Tamás Deutsch, a politician and Chairman of the MTK Budapest FC.

Club statistics

Updated to games played as of 26 May 2020.

References

External links
 
HLSZ 

1992 births
Living people
Footballers from Budapest
Hungarian footballers
Hungary youth international footballers
Hungary under-21 international footballers
Hungarian Jews
Jewish footballers
Association football defenders
Szigetszentmiklósi TK footballers
Pécsi MFC players
MTK Budapest FC players
Zalaegerszegi TE players
BFC Siófok players
Nemzeti Bajnokság I players
Nemzeti Bajnokság II players